Benoît Saint-Denis (born December 18, 1995) is a French professional mixed martial artist who competes in the lightweight division in the Ultimate Fighting Championship (UFC).

Early life
Benoît Saint-Denis was born in Nîmes, on December 18, 1995. His father was a French Foreign Legion officer practising judo at a good level, and his mother was a teacher. He practised judo from the age of 8 to 16 and earned a black belt. He also played football and rugby union in his youth.

Prior to his MMA career, Benoît Saint-Denis was a member of the 1st Marine Infantry Paratroopers Regiment, a unit of the French Army Special Forces Command. He served in Mali during the war and more generally in West Africa, fighting terrorist groups. He was awarded the Medal of the Nation's gratitude and the Combatant's cross in September 2017. He left the Army after five years of service in March 2019.

Mixed martial arts career

Early career
Saint Denis began kick-boxing with Stephane Susperregui and Brazilian jiu-jitsu (BJJ) with Christophe Savoca in 2018 in the Bayonne region where his regiment is located. He also tried MMA and won the Invictus amateur tournament, on December 15, 2018 in San Sebastian, Spain.

He stood out among sixty fighters during a test organized by Daniel Woirin, a French coach renowned for having won three belts at UFC and two at Strikeforce with MMA champions Anderson Silva, Dan Henderson and Lyoto Machida. Saint Denis, ending his contract with the army, decided to embark on a career as a professional MMA fighter early 2019. He gave himself two years to break through to the highest level in MMA. Two years was the time he had with his savings to train full time and get signed by the UFC.

He joined the Bulgarian Top Team of French manager Giom Peltier and won six fights in eleven months. Then the pace of the fights slowed down due to the COVID-19 pandemic. With Daniel Woirin, he stayed undefeated in welterweight and super lightweight divisions at the Brave Combat Federation.

Brazilian Jiu Jitsu
Benoit also competed in BJJ before his MMA career, winning the medium-heavyweight (under 88,3 kg/194 lbs) division, in blue belt, at the 2017 West Zone Championship in France, he also participated in the 2017 Paris International Open IBJJF Jiu Jitsu No Gi Championship, in the medium-heavyweight (under 88,3 kg/194 lbs) division, taking 3rd place. He won the middleweight (under 82,3 kg/181 lbs) division, at blue belt, in the absolute category, and took 2nd place on the regular category at the 2018 West Zone Championship in France. He was also the winner of both GI and NO Gi in the 2019 France National Championship, at blue belt in the middleweight (under 82,3 kg/181 lbs) division. He also participated in two shows for ACB JJ notably facing Yusup Raisov, losing by points.

Ultimate Fighting Championship
Saint-Denis made his UFC debut against Elizeu Zaleski dos Santos on October 30, 2021 at UFC 267. After nearly being finished multiple times throughout the fight, Saint-Denis lost the fight via unanimous decision.

Saint-Denis faced Niklas Stolze on June 4, 2022 at UFC Fight Night: Volkov vs. Rozenstruik. He won the bout after submitting Stolze in the second round.

He was scheduled to face Christos Giagos on September 3, 2022 at UFC Fight Night 209, in Paris. However, Giagos pulled out in early August after severing a tendon of his little finger during a domestic accident. Consequently, Saint-Denis faced Gabriel Miranda. He won the fight via technical knockout in the second round. This win earned him the Performance of the Night award.

Saint-Denis was scheduled to face Joe Solecki on February 18, 2023 at  UFC Fight Night 219. However, Saint-Denis withdrew from the bout citing ankle injury. It is unclear at the moment if a replacement would be sought by the UFC officials.

Mixed martial arts style

Saint-Denis has bright spots as a striker but is a far more comfortable grappler. Indeed, his MMA combat style is built around wrestling and submissions, and though he’s willing to stand and trade, he typically uses his striking to force opponents to the fence so he can look for takedowns.

Personal life
Besides his MMA career, Saint-Denis works as an instructor and a trainer for a French private security company named Chiron.

He married his fiancée Laura, a week before his fight at UFC Fight Night 209. Laura is a former French international futsal player who won the European Champions league with Toulouse Metropole FC,  She is now working as a dog trainer in the police. She was the first French female police officer undergoing Special weapons and Tactics (SWAT) course.

He wears four tattoos: the dagger from the French Special Forces, the samurai helmet from his first BJJ club, Joan of Arc for chivalrous spirit, and a Templar cross reminding the security missions he carried out in Mali.

Championships and accomplishments

Mixed martial arts
Ultimate Fighting Championship
Performance of the Night (One time) 
First French fighter to compete and to win on a UFC card in France.

Brave Combat Federation
2020 Brave CF Submission of the Year.

Mixed martial arts record

|Win
|align=center|10–1 (1)
|Gabriel Miranda
|TKO (punches)
|UFC Fight Night: Gane vs. Tuivasa
|
|align=center|2
|align=center|0:16
|Paris, France
|
|-
|Win
|align=center|9–1 (1)
|Niklas Stolze
|Submission (rear-naked choke) 
|UFC Fight Night: Volkov vs. Rozenstruik
|
|align=center|2
|align=center|1:32
|Las Vegas, Nevada, United States
|
|-
|Loss
|align=center|8–1 (1)
|Elizeu Zaleski dos Santos
|Decision (unanimous)
|UFC 267
|
|align=center|3
|align=center|5:00
|Abu Dhabi, United Arab Emirates
|
|-
|Win
|align=center|8–0 (1)
|Arkaitz Ramos
|Submission (arm-triangle choke)
|Brave CF 52 
|
|align=center|1
|align=center|3:09
|Milan, Italy
|
|-
|Win
|align=center|7–0 (1)
|Luan Santiago
|Submission (arm-triangle choke)
|Brave CF 49
|
|align=center|2
|align=center|3:51
|Arad, Bahrain
|
|-
|Win
|align=center|6–0 (1)
|Mario Saeed
|TKO (punches)
|Brave CF 38
|
|align=center|2
|align=center|1:49
|Stockholm, Sweden
|
|-
|Win
|align=center|5–0 (1)
|Ivica Trušček
|Submission (kneebar)
|Brave CF 34
|
|align=center|1
|align=center|3:39
|Ljubljana, Slovenia
|
|-
|NC
|align=center|4–0 (1)
|Paweł Kiełek
|NC (accidental clash of heads)
|Brave CF 28
|
|align=center|2
|align=center|5:00
|Bucharest, Romania
|
|-
|Win
|align=center|4–0
|Ibragim Baisarov
|Submission (armbar)
|European Beatdown 7
|
|align=center|1
|align=center|2:47
|Mons, Belgium
|
|-
|Win
|align=center|3–0
|Antoine Bensimon
|Submission (guillotine choke)
|Trophée de France
|
|align=center|1
|align=center|4:00
|Longjumeau, France
|
|-
|Win
|align=center|2–0
|Artur Szczepaniak
|Submission (rear-naked choke)
|Staredown FC 14
|
|align=center|3
|align=center|3:00
|Antwerp, Belgium
|
|-
|Win
|align=center|1–0
|Marc Domon
|Submission (guillotine choke)
|Lions FC 8
|
|align=center|1
|align=center|3:29
|Neuchâtel, Switzerland
|

See also
List of current UFC fighters
List of male mixed martial artists

Notes

References

External links

Living people
1995 births
French male mixed martial artists
Lightweight mixed martial artists
Welterweight mixed martial artists
Middleweight mixed martial artists
Mixed martial artists utilizing judo
Mixed martial artists utilizing kickboxing
Mixed martial artists utilizing boxing
Mixed martial artists utilizing wrestling
Mixed martial artists utilizing Brazilian jiu-jitsu
Ultimate Fighting Championship male fighters
French male judoka
French practitioners of Brazilian jiu-jitsu
Sportspeople from Nîmes
French Army personnel
Special forces of France